Qeran or Qerran may refer to:
 Qeran, Gilan
 Qeran, Kurdistan